Mallojaponin is a hydrolysable tannin found in the bark of Mallotus japonicus. This compound contains the moiety elaeocarpusinic acid, an oxidized hexahydroxydiphenic acid group (dehydrohexahydroxydiphenic acid or DHHDP) which reacted with a dehydroascorbic acid molecule. It also contains a valoneic acid and a gallic acid moieties linked to a glucose molecule.

References 

Ellagitannins